Osinovaya Gora is a rural locality (a settlement) in Chernushinsky District, Perm Krai, Russia. The population was 9 as of 2010. There is 1 street.

Geography 
Osinovaya Gora is located 7 km northeast of Chernushka (the district's administrative centre) by road.

References 

Rural localities in Chernushinsky District